Gemenefhorbak was an ancient Egyptian vizier who officiated during the 26th Dynasty, most likely under Psamtik I. His father was the vizier Iufaa.

Biography
Gemenefhorbak was the "Vizier of the North", meaning that he exercised his  authority over Lower Egypt. He is mainly known from his meta-graywacke sarcophagus which is now in the Museo Egizio (Turin 2201); on it, the carving of a necklace with the goddess Maat is a sign of his judicial office. The sarcophagus is also carved with a chapter of the Book of the Dead, as well as Gemenefhorbak's numerous titles; here he is also provided with the rather unusual title of "Controller of the great courts".

References

Ancient Egyptian viziers
People of the Twenty-sixth Dynasty of Egypt